Prince of Persia is an action-adventure and platforming video game developed by Ubisoft Montreal and published by Ubisoft. It is the seventh main installment in the Prince of Persia franchise, and the second reboot, establishing a new continuity that is separate from other games in the series. It was released in the United States on December 2, 2008, for PlayStation 3 and Xbox 360 (the fifth anniversary of the  Microsoft Windows release for The Sands of Time) and on December 9, 2008, for Windows. It was released on March 24, 2009, for Mac OS X via the Cider engine. The game was also released on November 11, 2008, by Gameloft for mobile phones that runs on the Java platform taking place in a 2D environment, and has a feature of enabling the players to control a second character at certain points of levels.

The game is set in ancient Persia, and follows an unnamed player-character, who finds himself in a mysterious land after a large sandstorm diverted him from his course. Here, he meets a princess named Elika, and must work with her to re-imprison the evil entity Ahriman, who has corrupted the land after being released by Elika's father. Throughout the journey, players traverse many different environments using his acrobatic abilities to scale walls and even crawl on the ceilings, and combat various enemies. The game's storyline and setting borrowed some aspects from Zoroastrianism.

Prince of Persia received generally positive from critics, and has sold over 2.2 million copies as of January 2009. An expansion pack that serves as an epilogue to the story was released in March 2009. The only other game in the series set in this continuity is Prince of Persia: The Fallen King, also released in December 2008 for the Nintendo DS.

Gameplay 
Prince of Persia revolves around gameplay mechanics that producer Ben Mattes identifies as "pillars" of the Prince of Persia series; an acrobatic hero exploring a Persian environment with a balanced mixture of acrobatics, combat, and puzzle-solving. The premise of Prince of Persia is that the player travels around the game world to heal specially designated spots of land. The player assumes the role of the acrobatic character, and is accompanied by the AI-controlled companion named Elika. The player can use the Prince character's acrobatic prowess, sword, and gauntlet, as well as magic from Elika to perform combat and acrobatic feats variously throughout the game.

Prince of Persia features open world exploration that allows the player to travel to any spot in the game world at any given point, and allows the player to witness the plot in any way they want. Depending on how the player progresses, previously visited areas will become more challenging to traverse when the player re-visits them. However, when the player heals a spot of land, it becomes devoid of traps. The traps are manifested in various forms of the antagonist Ahriman's Corruption; black-colored blobs that coat the land and swallow the player if touched. The player can use acrobatic maneuvers to avoid these traps.

The player has many acrobatic maneuvers at their disposal. Acrobatics are also used in combat to vault over enemies, or hit them into the air. Sometimes when performing these acrobatics, the player is aided by Elika. There are magical plates that allow the player to perform even more complicated acrobatic feats via Elika. If the player fails to signal Elika's magic, they fall off of the plate, sometimes to their death.

The player can not conventionally "die" in Prince of Persia. Rather, when an enemy is about to strike the finishing blow, or The Prince presumably falls to his death, Elika saves him. There is no limit on the number of times Elika can save a player, although an achievement is awarded for being saved fewer than 100 times during a playthrough. Along with saving the player, Elika can perform many acrobatic feats or combat feats in tandem with the player. The downloadable content Epilogue added a new magic plate that allows Elika to recreate destroyed objects. A new combat maneuver for the player was also added.

Synopsis

Setting 
Prince of Persia takes place in an undefined ancient Persian city-state based heavily around the religion of Zoroastrianism. A thousand years before the events of the game take place, there was a struggle for power between the gods Ahriman and Ormazd. The outcome of the struggle was that Ormazd and his people, the Ahura, managed to imprison Ahriman and his minions, the Corrupted, in a tree. Ormazd then left the world, leaving the Ahura to make sure Ahriman remains secure. They are successful for a thousand years, at which point the Ahura started to lose their powers, so they leave. Shortly before the events of the game, Ahriman is about to be freed again.

Characters 
Prince of Persias protagonist is a nameless adventurer in search of fortune. The adventurer is accompanied by an Ahura named Elika, whose race has forsaken the duty given to them by the god of light, Ormazd, and intend to set free the main antagonist, Ahriman, the god of darkness who was imprisoned by Ormazd. He is intent on conquering the entire universe upon his liberation. The Mourning King appears as an antagonist, intent on fulfilling his deal with Ahriman in return for the resurrection of his daughter, Elika. The Corrupted, four rulers Ahriman chose to aid him in conquering Ormazd, also appear as antagonists. They were imprisoned with him for a thousand years.

The Hunter is one of the Corrupted. He was a prince who enjoyed hunting, but soon became too good at hunting. Ahriman successfully made a deal with the Hunter that, in exchange for his soul, Ahriman would allow him to hunt a creature more satisfying than any he has hunted before. Another of the Corrupted is the Alchemist. He was an Ahura scientist who felt he was close to achieving immortality when his health started to fail. The Alchemist asked Ormazd for a longer lifespan to complete his research, but when he was refused, Ahriman offered him immortality in exchange for his soul. The third Corrupted is called the Concubine. She was a woman skilled in politics who revered men of power. She was involved with a man, but was ultimately beaten by another woman, scarred and stripped of her beauty and influence. The Concubine then exchanged her soul for the power of illusion with Ahriman. The fourth and strongest of the Corrupted is the Warrior. He was a king whose country was under siege. Struggling for peace, the king accepted power from Ahriman that allowed him to vanquish his enemies and secure peace for his people. However, when the war was over, the peace-loving citizens rejected the Warrior, who had turned into a tool of war.

Plot 
The game begins with the Prince (which is only a nickname, the game does not actually mention whether he is from a royal family or not) in search of his donkey, Farah, in the middle of a desert sandstorm. He then runs into Elika, a princess of the Ahura who is fleeing from soldiers. The two fend off the soldiers, with Elika discovering her magical powers of light. The Prince follows her into a temple which houses Ahriman, a force of evil who is trapped within a tree known as the Tree of Life. Once inside the temple, the Prince and Elika are confronted by Elika's father, the Mourning King, who faces them in battle. After the fight, he uses his sword to cut the Tree of Life, setting Ahriman free. The Prince and Elika escape the temple, only to find a corrupted world outside.

Elika tells the Prince that in order to restore the world and rid the corruption inhabiting it, they must heal all the Fertile Grounds in the kingdom. They then begin restoring the Fertile Grounds, encountering the Warrior, the Hunter, the Concubine and the Alchemist, four corrupted leaders Ahriman chose to set free.

In the journey, it is revealed that Elika had died prior to the beginning of the game. Her father took her to Ahriman and asked him to revive her selling his soul in the process to Ahriman, thus making him one of the corrupted. Once Elika is revived she discovers she has new-found powers. After gaining even more powers, the two encounter Elika's father once again. After healing all the Fertile Grounds, as well as defeating all bosses, Elika and the Prince return to the temple to imprison Ahriman. Once inside, however, they are confronted by the king who is now a fully corrupted being. They defeat him, he calls his daughter's name, turns away from them and throws himself off the platform they are on. Ahriman rises from the corruption below. They battle him, but Elika must give up her very life to finish the spell which seals Ahriman away. She finishes the spell and dies.

The Prince then takes Elika's body outside. There are four Fertile Grounds there, each with a tree, that according to what Elika had told him, channel the power of all the Fertile Grounds to the Tree of Life. He is given a vision which is the same one both he and Elika shared much earlier that shows her father's deal with Ahriman to revive her. When they shared the vision at that time she told the Prince that visions come from Ormazd, not Ahriman. The vision (just like the main debate throughout the game between Elika and the Prince was all about Destiny vs Free Will) is all about choice. The Prince re-creates the deal made by Elika's father. He destroys the four Fertile Grounds around the Temple and returns inside. He cuts down the Tree of Life and takes the light power Elika used to heal the Tree. The Prince returns the Light to Elika's body, and she returns to life. The game ends with the Prince carrying Elika across the desert while Ahriman's darkness envelops the world and the Temple is destroyed.

Epilogue 
In Epilogue, an optional expansion pack set after the main story, it is shown that the Prince and Elika survive, and retreat to an underground palace. Elika, furious with the Prince for dooming the world to save her, abandons him. However, they both end up battling Elika's father once again. They escape, and attempt to leave the palace alive. While on their way, Elika shows her frustration with the Prince multiple times, believing bringing her back was not worth the price of the evil it unleashed. The Prince counters that by freeing her, they "stand a chance" against Ahriman. In a final battle against Elika's father, the Prince defeats him by impaling him on spikes, a visual reference to the original Prince of Persia game. In the end, Elika leaves the Prince to search for her people and the Prince is left alone with a bloodthirsty Ahriman seeking revenge.

Development 
Proof of conception for Prince of Persia was found in September 2006, when a file that was leaked to the internet was found to contain concept art for the game, although Ubisoft didn't announce the game until May 2008. They stated that they expected to release the game towards the fourth quarter of 2008, and gave details about the plot and game play. In one such preview of the game, they revealed that the general staples of the game play remained intact, although altered drastically. These staples are platforming, combat, and puzzle-solving. It was also revealed that the game's combat would be one-on-one fights, similar to the original Prince of Persia trilogy, rather than fighting hordes of enemies at any time, as in the Sands of Time series. Producer Ben Mattes stated that the intent in changing the combat so drastically was to give players the impression that each enemy was a unique and dramatic experience in itself. Prince of Persia utilizes a heavily modified version of the Scimitar engine, which was also used in Assassin's Creed.
Developers chose to use this engine because it would allow them to enhance the game by adding more expansive worlds, and less linearity. In May 2008, Ubisoft released two official videos of a concept artist designing the Prince character and Elika. One video shows the Prince character being drawn, while the other details Elika. Yet another fast-forward concept art emerged in July 2008, this time depicting an antagonist: the Hunter. Unlike previous Ubisoft games such as Assassin's Creed, the PC version of Prince of Persia contains no digital rights protection.

Mattes said that when Ubisoft was initially developing the game, cooperative gameplay with an AI-controlled partner was the main idea they wanted to build on. Mattes explained, "We knew from day one basically cooperative gameplay was the hook that was going to replace Sands of Time... We didn't always know that it was going to be Elika from day one... We sort of explored the idea of maybe a child or father figure or brother, or something like that." The idea to base the game around AI-controlled functions came from Prince of Persia: The Sands of Time. Mattes explained that the team felt the relationship between Farah and the Prince character worked well from a story-telling point-of-view in Prince of Persia: The Sands of Time, so they decided to expand on the concept.

Downloadable content 
Downloadable content for Prince of Persia, titled Epilogue, was confirmed by Ben Mattes in an interview with IGN. Mattes said that the new content would include new areas to explore, new enemies, new combat maneuvers, and a new power for Elika to use. The content was planned for release on February 26, 2009, on the Xbox 360 and PlayStation 3 consoles, but was delayed one week, releasing on March 5, 2009. Citing business reasons, Ubisoft did not release Epilogue for PC version of the game.

Reception 

The game was well received by most critics, scoring an 81%, 85%, and 82% on Metacritic for the Xbox 360, PlayStation 3, and PC, respectively.

IGN writer Hilary Goldstein praised the game for its simple but visually spectacular acrobatics and combat, but noted that one must "embrace the change [to the series]" in order to "fall in love [with it]". Goldstein also praised Elika, the secondary character of the game, as a useful sidekick during gameplay and also as a likeable character with a great relationship with the Prince.

GameSpot's Kevin VanOrd shared a similar opinion and in addition praised its excellent artistic design.

However, many criticized the game for being too easy or "consumer-friendly", regarding the simple platforming and combat segments. Eurogamer described it as a "poor game" with "excessive repetition" but nonetheless with "fantastic technology and interesting mechanics". 1UP.com criticized the trial-and-error nature of the platforming gameplay.

Many comparisons have been drawn to other video games in terms of artistic design and gameplay. Examples include Mirror's Edge and Ubisoft's own Assassin's Creed with unique platforming and timing-based combat. The vast open-world environment with intense boss fights have been compared to Ico and Shadow of the Colossus, and the watercolor looks to Ōkami.

Sales 
Ubisoft has released sales figures showing that Prince of Persia has sold over 2.2 million copies worldwide as of January 2009.

Awards 
On February 19, 2009, Prince of Persia was awarded the "Outstanding Achievement in Animation" at the twelfth Annual Interactive Achievement Awards.

References

External links 

  (archived from the original)
 

2008 video games
Action-adventure games
Hack and slash games
Interactive Achievement Award winners
MacOS games
Open-world video games
PlayStation 3 games
Prince of Persia games
Ubisoft games
Video game reboots
Video games scored by Inon Zur
Video games scored by Stuart Chatwood
Video games developed in Canada
Video games set in Iran
Video games with cel-shaded animation
Video games with expansion packs
Video games based on mythology
Windows games
Xbox 360 games
3D platform games
Gameloft games
J2ME games
Single-player video games